The inferior vestibular nucleus is the vestibular nucleus which lies near the fourth ventricle.

External links
 https://web.archive.org/web/20111109232230/http://www.neuroanatomy.wisc.edu/virtualbrain/BrainStem/13VNAN.html
 http://www.anatomyatlases.org/MicroscopicAnatomy/Section17/Plate17331.shtml
 

Cranial nerve nuclei